The Kunlun Mountains is a large mountain range between the Tibetan Plateau and the Tarim Basin in western China.

Kunlun may also refer to:

People
Kunlun (崑崙 or 昆侖), also Juelun (掘倫), a general term for Southeast Asians and Southeast Asia (particularly Champa and Island Southeast Asia) in Chinese historical records; the term later included enslaved Negritos, Papuans, and Africans.
Kunlun Nu, a wuxia romance about a Negrito slave from Southeast Asia
K'un-lun po (崑崙舶), or Kunlun bo, ancient sailing ships of the Austronesian traders from Island Southeast Asia described in Chinese records in the Han Dynasty

Places 
Kunlun (mythology), a mountain in Chinese mythology
Kunlun Fault, a geological fault along the Kunlun Mountains
Kunlun Pass, Guangxi, China
Kunlun Station (Antarctica), a Chinese research station

Other uses 
Kunlun Energy, a Chinese oil and gas company
Kunlun Fight, a Chinese Kickboxing promotion
Kunlun School, a fictional martial arts school in wuxia fiction
Kunlun Shan (998), a Chinese ship
3613 Kunlun, a main-belt asteroid
Huawei KunLun Mission Critical Server

See also